The 30th New Zealand Parliament was a term of the New Zealand Parliament. It was elected at the 1951 general election on 1 September of that year.

1951 general election

The 1951 general election was held on Saturday, 1 September.

Sessions
The 30th Parliament sat for five sessions (there were two sessions in 1954), and was prorogued on 4 October 1954.

Ministries

Overview of seats
The table below shows the number of MPs in each party following the 1951 election and at dissolution:

Notes
The Working Government majority is calculated as all Government MPs less all other parties.

Initial composition of the 30th Parliament
The 1951 election saw the governing National Party re-elected with a twenty-seat margin, a substantial improvement on the twelve-seat margin it previously held. National won fifty seats compared with the Labour Party's thirty. The popular vote was closer, however, with National winning 54% to Labour's 46%. No seats were won by minor party candidates or by independents. This was the last New Zealand general election in which any party has ever captured a majority of the popular vote.

By-elections during 30th Parliament
There were a number of changes during the term of the 30th Parliament.

Notes

References

30